South Ural State Medical University is a public university in Chelyabinsk, Russia.

Universities in Chelyabinsk Oblast
Chelyabinsk
Buildings and structures in Chelyabinsk Oblast
Medical schools in Russia
Public universities and colleges in Russia
Public medical universities
1944 establishments in Russia
Educational institutions established in 1944
Universities and institutes established in the Soviet Union